Randolph is a town in Orange County, Vermont, United States. The population was 4,774 at the 2020 census, making Randolph the largest town in Orange County. The town is a commercial center for many of the smaller, rural farming communities that surround it.

When the area was originally settled there were three villages—Randolph Center, East Randolph and West Randolph—the current locations of the three fire departments. What is now Randolph, the primary village of the town, had previously been the village of West Randolph.

History

Vermont granted the town on November 2, 1780, when the New Hampshire settlers could not locate the original grantees, whose patents were issued by New York. It was chartered on June 29, 1781 to Aaron Storrs and 70 others, and was originally named "Middlesex".

The town was first settled , when Vermont was an unrecognized state whose government existed in defiance of the government of New York, which claimed Vermont was a part of New York. To encourage recognition of the state by the United States, the town was renamed in honor of Edmund Randolph.

With productive soil for cultivation, farming became an intensive industry. By 1830, when the population reached 2,743, between twelve and thirteen thousand sheep grazed its pastures. Randolph was noted for its good butter, cheese and mutton.

Two branches of the White River provided water power for watermills. By 1859, the town had three gristmills, one oil mill, and one carding mill. In 1848, the Vermont Central Railroad opened service through the town. Randolph's prosperity during the Victorian era endowed it with some fine architecture, including the Second Empire Randolph Railroad Depot and Renaissance Revival Kimball Public Library.

In 1921, Randolph was the setting for, and provided some of the cast of, a silent movie called The Offenders. In 1922 the same was true for the film Insinuation.

Today, Randolph is a thriving meeting-spot and shopping center for the surrounding area. The town is home to attractions such as the Porter Music Box Museum and the Chandler Music Hall. Also located in Randolph are the Gifford Medical Center, a hospital; Dubois & King, a civil and structural engineering firm; and Randolph Union High School, which also serves students from the neighboring towns of Braintree and Brookfield. Downtown Randolph hosts the Amtrak station, shops, restaurants, a movie theater, and several gas stations.

Geography
According to the United States Census Bureau, the town has a total area of 47.9 square miles (124.1 km2), of which 47.9 square miles (124.0 km2) is land and 0.04 square mile (0.1 km2) (0.08%) is water. Randolph is drained by the second and third branches of the White River.

Demographics

As of the census of 2000, there were 4,853 people, 1,769 households, and 1,144 families residing in the town.  The population density was 101.4 people per square mile (39.2/km2).  There were 1,905 housing units at an average density of 39.8 per square mile (15.4/km2).  The racial makeup of the town was 97.77% White, 0.21% African American, 0.14% Native American, 0.60% Asian, 0.08% Pacific Islander, 0.02% from other races, and 1.17% from two or more races. Hispanic or Latino of any race were 0.54% of the population.

There were 1,769 households, out of which 31.5% had children under the age of 18 living with them, 50.9% were couples living together and joined in either marriage or civil union, 9.6% had a female householder with no husband present, and 35.3% were non-families. 27.7% of all households were made up of individuals, and 12.6% had someone living alone who was 65 years of age or older.  The average household size was 2.45 and the average family size was 3.00.

In the town, the population was spread out, with 23.3% under the age of 18, 15.9% from 18 to 24, 23.8% from 25 to 44, 23.1% from 45 to 64, and 13.9% who were 65 years of age or older.  The median age was 36 years. For every 100 females, there were 103.1 males.  For every 100 females age 18 and over, there were 105.4 males.

The median income for a household in the town was $41,283, and the median income for a family was $50,756. Males had a median income of $31,353 versus $25,160 for females. The per capita income for the town was $20,591.  About 5.3% of families and 7.9% of the population were below the poverty line, including 7.7% of those under age 18 and 7.5% of those age 65 or over.

Education
The main campus of Vermont Technical College is located in Randolph Center.

Two public schools operated by the Orange Southwest Supervisory Union serve Randolph.
Randolph Elementary School K–6
Randolph Union Jr. High School, grades 7–12

Transportation

Roads and highways
Randolph is served by five state-maintained routes. Interstate 89 passes through Randolph and has one exit near the center of town. Paralleling the Interstate are Vermont Route 12, which passes through downtown Randolph and the western half of town, and Vermont Route 14, which passes through the eastern half of town. East-west Vermont Route 66, which is located entirely within Randolph, connects all three of those north-south routes. Vermont Route 12A splits from Vermont Route 12 just north of downtown Randolph and heads to the northwest to enter Braintree.

Public transportation

Amtrak, the national passenger rail system, provides daily service to Randolph, operating its Vermonter between Washington, D.C. and St. Albans, Vermont. Stagecoach Transportation Services provides local bus transportation across town, Orange County and to and from the White River Junction and Lebanon, New Hampshire areas.

Media

Weekly newspaper
The Herald of Randolph

Radio

 WWFY – 100.9 FM  (Froggy 100.9 FM – Today's BIG Country)
 WRFK – 107.1 FM (107.1 Frank FM – Classic Rock)
 WCVR – 1320 AM (Real Country 1320 – country)
 WVXR – 102.1 FM (VPR Classical)
 WVTC – 90.7 FM (Vermont Tech Radio – various music)

Sites of interest

Notable people 

 George W. Barker, U.S. Marshal for Vermont, Judge of Maniwitoc County, Wisconsin
 Jedediah Berry, author
 Dudley Blodget, Wisconsin politician
 Calvin H. Blodgett, mayor of Burlington, Vermont
 Albert Brown Chandler, president of the Postal Telegraph Company
 Dudley Chase, United States Senator
 Harry H. Cooley, Secretary of State of Vermont
 William H. Dubois, Vermont State Treasurer
 Joseph Edson, U.S. Marshal for Vermont
 Lebbeus Egerton, Lieutenant Governor of Vermont
 Martin Flint, Anti-Masonic Party leader who served as Adjutant General of the Vermont Militia
 Henrik Galeen, actor, director
 William Hebard, US congressman
 Carroll Ketchum, Vermont state legislator
 Zosia Mamet, singer, actress
 Jean Merrill, writer and editor
 Colonel Jonathan Miller, Freedom fighter, abolitionist and women's rights
 Justin Morgan, horse breeder and composer
 Sherman R. Moulton, Chief Justice of the Vermont Supreme Court
 Buster Olney, columnist for ESPN The Magazine
 John K. Parish. Wisconsin state legislator and jurist
 John W. Rowell, Chief Justice of the Vermont Supreme Court
 John C. Sherburne, Vermont's first Rhodes Scholar and Chief Justice of the Vermont Supreme Court
 Milan H. Sessions, politician
 Ronni Solbert, children’s book illustrator
 Larry Townsend, Vermont legislator
 Levi Baker Vilas, Vermont and Wisconsin politician
 Stephen W. Webster, Vermont state legislator who served as President pro tempore of the Vermont Senate
 Jessamyn West, librarian

International relations
Randolph is twinned with:
 Myrhorod

See also 
 List of towns in Vermont

References

External links

 Kimball Public Library
 Virtual Vermont – Randolph, Vermont
 Randolph Herald – local newspaper
 Randolph Historical Society – local history museum

 
Towns in Vermont
Towns in Orange County, Vermont